Conrad Ossian (March 27, 1900 – June 6, 1976) was an American politician who served in the Iowa House of Representatives from the 12th district from 1957 to 1971.

References

1900 births
1976 deaths
Republican Party members of the Iowa House of Representatives
20th-century American politicians
People from Montgomery County, Iowa